Holddown works by having each router start a timer when they first receive information about a network that is unreachable. Until the timer expires, the router will discard any subsequent route messages that indicate the route is in fact reachable. It can solve the case where multiple routers are connected indirectly. There are realistic scenarios where split horizon and split horizon with poisoned reverse can do nothing.

In other words, a holddown keeps a router from receiving route updates until the network appears to be stable—until either an interface stops changing state (flapping) or a better route is learned.

Holddowns are usually implemented with timers. If the router detects that a network is unreachable, the timer is started. The router will then wait a preset number of seconds until the network is stable. When the timer expires, the router will then receive its routing updates from other routers. For example, in RIP the default holddown timer is set to 180 seconds.

References

Routing protocols